State nicknames may refer to:

List of U.S. state and territory nicknames
Vehicle registration plates of Australia